Hermine Dudley (née Jahns; born 1890) was an American woman who, in 1909 at age 19, accompanied Alice Huyler Ramsey when she became the first woman to drive across the United States. She later married Pendleton Dudley and was the mother of the choreographer Jane Dudley.

The 1995 juvenile historical fiction book Coast to Coast with Alice is told in her voice.

References

Further reading
 

1890s births
Year of death missing
20th-century American women
20th-century American people